The Jimmy Swift Band (JSB) is a Canadian indie rock band from Halifax, Nova Scotia that combines elements of rock, jam, and electronica. Made up of Craig Mercer on guitar and vocals, Mike MacDougall on bass, Aaron Collier on keyboards and effects, and Nick Wombolt on drums, the band has been most often described as rocktronica.

Career
Formed in the late 1990s by members of the now defunct band PF Station, JSB's name comes from the title of a subject in one of PF Station's songs, "A Night in the Life of Fly Jimmy Swift".  Before their current name, the band was previously known Fly Jimmy Swift.
Combining intricate guitar and a distinctly electronica keyboard sound with a hard hitting and rock solid rock rhythm section, the band is known for its exciting live show full of lengthy progressive instrumental jams that always get the crowd up and moving.

The band has released 5 studio albums, 2 live albums, a live 5.1 concert DVD, a remix album, and a greatest hits package on 8-track tape. They've won three East Coast Music Awards, and numerous Music Industry Association of Nova Scotia (MIANS/Music Nova Scotia) awards over the past 15 years.

In 2004 the band produced their first video for the single "Two Hands on the Wheel" with New Brunswick filmmaker Greg Hemmings.  On November 28, 2006, JSB released an animated video produced by Copernicus Studios for the single "Turnaround", from the album Weight of the World.
 
For close to 15 years, the band maintained a busy touring schedule, playing up to 250 shows a year across Canada and the US with stints in Asia and the Bahamas, they have performed internationally at numerous festivals worldwide and were considered instrumental in the development of Eastern Canada's Evolve Festival and Prince Edward Island's Shoreline Festival. Other events include Moedown (NY), Haymaker (VA), the World Electronic Music Festival (Toronto), Canada Day celebrations in Bermuda and many more.  The group are at the head of the Atlantic Canada jam scene, and frequently play with fellow scene mates Grand Theft Bus, and Slowcoaster.

On May 13, 2011 it was announced by Aaron Collier on his website that the band had decided to break up. Three years later the band announced it would be touring Eastern Canada for one final tour, ending with a performance at the Evolve Music Festival in Antigonish, Nova Scotia.

Discography

Albums
Now They Will Know We Were Here – 2001
"Creepin'"
"Up in Arms"
"Beautiful in the Morning"
"Drive By"
"Now They Will Know We Were Here"
"Dreams"
"Commotion"
"Warm and Fuzzy Feeling"
"Concrete"
"When Worlds Collide"
"Rearrange"

Onward Through the Fog – 2003
"Two Hands on the Wheel"
"Running High"
"Granted"
"The 80s Runway Model"
"Anhedonia"
"When It Comes to It"
"Now and Then"
"Yard Sale"
"Astronauts Attempting to Take Off Their Spacesuits so They May Copulate"
"Alignment"

The Rebirth Of Hooch – 2004
"Now They Will Know We Were Here (pt 1)"
"Now They Will Know We Were Here (pt 2)"
"Creepin'"
"Daisy"
"Astronauts Attempting to Take Off Their Spacesuits..."
"...So They May Copulate"
"The 80s Runway Model"

Precious Gems & Rarities (8-track cartridge only) – 2005
Weight of the World – 2006
"Daisy"
"Turnaround"
"Mobilized"
"Immobilize"
"Roadrage"
"Onward Through the Fog"
"Exploration"
"Weight of the World"
"Faceless"
"2012"
"Evacuation"

When All Is Said And Done... ...There'll Be A Lot More Said Than Done – 2011
"Immobilized"
"Evacuation (Remix)"
"Daisy (Remix)"
"Medicine Chest"
"Turning Of The Tide"
"Running Through The Tall Grass"
"The Bend"
"Goodbye"
"Onward Through The Fog (Remix)"
"Faceless (Remix)"
"Weight Of The World (Remix)"
"Road Rage"
"Outfacing"

PF Station
Ahh Yeah (Drop Records) – 1998

Videos
"Turnaround"

References

External links
The Jimmy Swift Band bandcamp site

"Turnaround"

Musical groups established in 1999
Musical groups disestablished in 2011
Musical groups from Halifax, Nova Scotia
Canadian alternative rock groups
Canadian electronic music groups
1999 establishments in Nova Scotia
2011 disestablishments in Nova Scotia